Michael Loychik (born April 7, 1989) is an American politician who is currently the Ohio state representative in Ohio's 65th district. He won the seat after defeating incumbent Democrat Gil Blair, 54.2% to 45.8%. He served in the United States Air Force from 2008 to 2015.

Electoral history

References

1989 births
Living people
People from Warren, Ohio
United States Air Force airmen
Community College of the Air Force alumni
Columbia Southern University alumni
Republican Party members of the Ohio House of Representatives
21st-century American politicians